Zduša (in older sources also Zduše) is a settlement on the left bank of the Kamnik Bistrica River in the Municipality of Kamnik in the Upper Carniola region of Slovenia.

A 16th-century mansion in the settlement, known after its last owners as the Rebolj Mansion, is in a state of rapid deterioration.

References

External links

Zduša on Geopedia

Populated places in the Municipality of Kamnik